Talovka is a rural locality (a settlement) and the administrative center of Talovskoye Rural Settlement, Yelansky District, Volgograd Oblast, Russia. The population was 711 as of 2010. There are 10 streets.

Geography 
Talovka is located on Khopyorsko-Buzulukskaya Plain, on Mokraya Talovka River, 72 km southwest of Yelan (the district's administrative centre) by road. Pervokamensky is the nearest rural locality.

References 

Rural localities in Yelansky District